Mary Rickert, known as M. Rickert (born December 11, 1959 in Port Washington, Wisconsin), is an American writer of fantasy fiction. Many of her stories have been published in The Magazine of Fantasy & Science Fiction.  Her first collection, Map of Dreams, was published by Golden Gryphon Press in 2006; her second collection, Holiday, appeared in 2010 from the same publisher.  She lives in Wisconsin.

Rickert's fiction has won or been nominated for several major awards.  "Journey into the Kingdom" was nominated for the 2006 Nebula Award for Best Novelette and an International Horror Guild Award, and won the 2007 World Fantasy Award for Best Short Fiction.  Map of Dreams won the 2007 World Fantasy Award for Best Collection and the 2007 Crawford Award, and the collection's title story was nominated for the 2007 World Fantasy Award for Best Novella.  On November 10, 2015, Small Beer Press will publish Rickert's third collection, You Have Never Been Here, containing selected stories from her first two collections, as well as three new stories, one of them a novella.

Bibliography

Novels

Short fiction
Collections

List of stories

Awards
 2007 World Fantasy Award for Best Short Story for Journey into the Kingdom
 2007 World Fantasy Award for Best Collection for Map of Dreams
 2007 Crawford Award for Map of Dreams
 2011 Shirley Jackson Award for Best Short Fiction “The Corpse Painter’s Masterpiece”.

References

External links

 
An interview with M. Rickert
Another brief interview
A third interview
Online texts of Rickert's stories "Anyway" and "The Girl Who Ate Butterflies"
Golden Gryphon Press official site - About Map of Dreams

1959 births
Living people
21st-century American novelists
21st-century American short story writers
American fantasy writers
American short story writers
American women novelists
American women short story writers
People from Port Washington, Wisconsin
The Magazine of Fantasy & Science Fiction people
Women science fiction and fantasy writers
World Fantasy Award-winning writers
Novelists from Wisconsin
21st-century American women writers